The siege of Fellin took place between 25 March and 17 May 1602 during the Polish–Swedish War (1600–1611). Polish and Lithuanian forces led by Grand Crown Hetman Jan Zamoyski besieged the Swedish-held town of Fellin (present-day Viljandi in Estonia). The large Polish–Lithuanian army of around 5,000 troops first took the town, while the Swedish defenders, numbering around 800, retreated to the city's castle. After a second frontal attack on the castle, during which the Voivode of Wenden Jerzy Farensbach was killed, the Swedish garrison capitulated, although a group of Finnish soldiers refused to surrender and blew themselves up in the castle's tower. Fellin was later recaptured by the Swedes in the siege of 1608.

References

Podhorodecki, Leszek. Rapier i koncerz: z dziejów wojen polsko-szwedzkich. Książka i Wiedza. Warsaw. 1985.

Fell
Fell
Fellin
Fellin
Conflicts in 1602
Viljandi
17th century in Estonia
Military history of Estonia
1602 in Europe